François Daviet (1734-1799) was a military officer and mathematician from Savoy in the 18th century.
The family name is sometimes also reported in original sources as Daviet de Foncenex, probably from the original village of the family.

Life and work 

Little is known about his life. Born in Savoy, he studied in the Accademia di Torino under the professorship of Lagrange, two years younger than him. In 1759 he was named member of the Accademia delle Scienze di Torino. He was appointed lieutenant in the army of the Kingdom of Sardinia (the king of Sardinia was the ruler of the Duchy of Savoy) and after some promotions in the army, he was governor of Sassari (1790–91) and of Villefranche-sur-Mer. In 1792 he participated in the wars against French revolutionary army, and he was judged by treason and imprisoned for one year.

Daviet published in the years 1759-1760 two important papers in the journal of the Academy, Miscellanea Taurinensis: the first one (1759) about imaginary numbers is titled Mémoire sur les logarithmes des quantités négatives and has an extension titled Éclaircissements sur les quantités imaginaires; more important is the second one, titled Sur les principes fondamentaux de la méchanique (1761). In four sections (law of inertia, composition of forces, equilibrium and law of the lever) he tried to establish the a priori fundamental laws of mechanics.

In 1789 he published a paper: Récit d'une foudre ascendante éclatée sur la tour du fanal de Villefranche.

Finally, in 1799, the academy published an ensemble of many of his works, named Principes fondamentaux de la méchanique.

References

Bibliography

External links 
 
 

1734 births
1799 deaths
18th-century French people
18th-century mathematicians